Next Time is the debut album of the Macedonian pop rock duo also called Next Time. The release of the album marked Next Time's fast gained success as part of the music scene of North Macedonia. After releasing 4 singles in just about 4 months, Next Time entered the studio for completing their first musical project and recorded 9 other songs. The finished album contained 13 songs, two of which were sung in a language other than Macedonian. It was a mix of slow and fast songs, topped with a bonus track in English and a cover from an old Italian pop-opera song. At the promotion for the album held in the hotel Holiday Inn in Skopje, North Macedonia over 2,000 people were present to support the newly formed duo and their first album. After a brief note from producer Jovan Jovanov, the duo performed 6 songs from the CD live at the promotion to the pleasure of the gathered crowd.

Track listing
"Me ostavi sam" 
"Sekoj za sebe"  
"Milion"  
"Ne veruvam vo tebe"
“Bez tebe tivko umiram" 
”Me mislis li”
"Nemam ni glas”
"Caruso”(Lucio Dalla)
"Izguben"
”Ne sakam da razberam”
”Nemoj da places za kraj”
"Nesto Sto ke ostane" (something that will remain)(Eurovison 2009 song)
”Sleden pat”
”Why did you go”

"Bonus Track: Na krajot od denot Remix

2008 albums
Next Time albums